{{Infobox television
| image                = The Biggest Game Show in the World Asia.jpg
| caption              =
| genre                = Reality competition
| creator              = 
| theme_music_composer = 
| runtime              = 60 minutes
| presenter            = Joey De LeonRichard GomezMr. Fu
| director             = Monti Parungao
| executive_producer   = Rose C. Camia
| writer               = Joseph Bolintiam
| editor               = Reichelle Reyes
| opentheme            = "Ipakita Mo" by Voyz Avenue
| country              = Malaysia
| language             = English
| network              = TV5 (Philippines)  RCTI (Indonesia)  VTC9 - Let's Viet (Vietnam)  Kantana (Thailand)
| company              = Mistral Productions/ IceTV
| first_aired          = 
| last_aired           = 
| num_seasons          = 1
| num_episodes         = 14 (final)
| related              = The Biggest Game Show in the World 
}}The Biggest Game Show in the World (Asia) is an Asian reality game show based on the French TV game shows, The Biggest Game Show in the World''. It is broadcast on Filipino television channel TV5, and also broadcast on Indonesian television channel RCTI.

Presenters

Indonesia
 Arie Untung

Philippines
 Richard Gomez
 Joey de Leon

Music
 Alain Weiller

See also
 List of programs broadcast by TV5 (Philippines)
 List of programs aired by TV5 (Philippines)

References

External links
  In Asia
  Philippines 
  Indonesia
 

TV5 (Philippine TV network) original programming
2012 Philippine television series debuts
2012 Philippine television series endings
Philippine reality television series
Filipino-language television shows